The Prek Pnov Bridge is a 996 m bridge that crosses the Tonle Sap River in the Phnom Penh province at Prek Pnov.

References

Road bridges in Phnom Penh
Transport in Phnom Penh